Gulf Cooperation Council homosexuality test was a proposed homosexuality test that would have been used in Gulf states to prevent any homosexual travelers from entering the countries. The director of public health Yousuf Mindkar from the Kuwaiti Ministry of Health initially proposed that routine medical examinations would have also screened for homosexuality. Obtaining a visa already requires passing a health examination for migrant workers from certain countries. Those who would have failed the tests would have had their visas revoked.

It has been suggested that concern for hosting 2022 FIFA World Cup in Qatar, and fears for controversy in a case that football fans would have been screened, made Mindkar to backtrack the plans and insist that it was a mere proposal. The proposal was set to be discussed in Oman on 11 November 2013 by a central committee tasked with reviewing the situation concerning expatriates. Previously in 2012 over 2 million expatriates across Gulf Cooperation Council countries were gender tested.

Homosexuality is illegal in most Gulf Cooperation Council member states including Saudi Arabia, Kuwait, the United Arab Emirates, Qatar and Oman, with the notable exception of Bahrain.

Reactions
There is no known working medical test for homosexuality in existence. Some gay activists were worried that the Kuwaiti test would have used anal probes. Lebanon uses such methods at police stations to determine what sexual practices suspected criminals have engaged in. One such instance was in 2012 when a movie theater was raided for pornography and 36 Lebanese men were subjected to anal examinations. Peter Tatchell and the UK-based foundation carrying his name demanded boycotting or cancelling the 2022 FIFA World Cup that is to be held in Qatar. Amnesty International strongly opposed any plans to introduce tests for discriminatory purposes against sexual minorities. Nasser Al Khater, the chief executive of the Cup, said, “Everyone is welcome” to visit the country to watch the matches and no one will be discriminated against.

It was also pointed out by Richard Lane from gay rights charity group Stonewall that restricting freedom of movement due to sexual orientation would be problematic to Gulf States that have marketed themselves as open to international business.

See also

Fruit machine (homosexuality test)
LGBT in the Middle East
2022 FIFA World Cup controversies
Body cavity search
Rectal examination
Virginity test

References

Gulf Cooperation Council
Homophobia
LGBT rights in Asia
LGBT in the Arab world
LGBT in the Middle East